"It's Gonna Work Out Fine" is a song written by Rose Marie McCoy and Joe Seneca (also known as Sylvia McKinney). It was originally released by Ike & Tina Turner in 1961 as a single from their album Dynamite! (1962). The record is noted for being their first Grammy nominated song and their second million-selling single after "A Fool In Love".

Recording and release
Following the success of "A Fool in Love", Ike & Tina Turner scored another hit with "I Idolize You", and they released their debut album, The Soul of Ike & Tina Turner in February 1961. They toured all over the country on the Chitlin' Circuit as The Ike & Tina Turner Revue, which included Ike's band the Kings of Rhythm, and three backing vocalist known as the Ikettes.

Songwriter Rose Marie McCoy co-wrote "It's Gonna Work Out Fine," but she didn't care for the song. It was copyrighted by Joe Seneca and James Lee. After being suggested by her writing partner to hear Tina Turner sing, McCoy attended their show at the Apollo in New York and approached the duo about recording the song.

Juggy Murray is credited as the sole producer, but the duo Mickey & Sylvia contributed to the song. Sylvia Robinson arranged, produced, and played guitar while Mickey Baker played the role of Ike Turner. In a 1981 interview with Black Radio Exclusive magazine Robinson said, "I paid for the session, taught Tina the song; that's me playing guitar." Mickey & Sylvia also recorded a version of the song in 1960 which was unreleased until their 1990 compilation album Love Is Strange.

Ike & Tina Turner's version was released as a single in June 1961 and became their biggest hit since "A Fool in Love". It peaked at No. 2 on the Billboard Hot R&B Sides chart and became their third pop hit, reaching No. 14 on the Hot 100.

In addition to being released on the album Dynamite! in 1962, the song was also released on the album It's Gonna Work Out Fine in 1963.

Critical reception 

Billboard (June 19, 1961): "Ike and Tina talk about love on this attractive disk which also features a gospel-styled chorus. Pair handle the tune with gusto and it has a chance."

Cash Box (June 24, 1961): Ike & Tina Turner, who’ve had dual-mart R&B-pop chart representations in "A Fool In Love" and "I Idolize You," can soon be claiming another one in "It's Gonna Work Out Fine." Side, a hip-swinging, beat-ballad thumper, sports a delectable chorus-backed, verbal exchange between the two. Strings play an important part in the rhythmic, rock-a-shuffler on the lower end.

Awards and nominations 
"It's Gonna Work Out Fine" earned Ike and Tina their first Grammy Award nomination for Best Rock & Roll Recording at the 4th Annual Grammy Awards.

Sequels and re-recordings 
Ike and Tina  released several "sequels" related to the song, including 1962's "The Argument", in which they sang in a similar way but this time involved in an argument, and the "official" sequel, "Something Came Over You", recorded during their tenure at Kent Records.

In 1966 the Turners re-recorded the original for the album, River Deep - Mountain High. The duo re-recorded the song again in 1975.

In 1993 Tina re-recorded the song for the soundtrack to the biopic, What's Love Got to Do with It. Her saxophonist, Timmy Cappello, sang Ike's lines.

Live performances 
"It's Gonna Work Out Fine" was performed in most of Ike and Tina's sets in the 1960s, most notably on The Big T.N.T. show in 1965, but as they began incorporating covers of rock tunes to their show, the song was rarely performed again. However, they performed the song on The Tonight Show Starring Johnny Carson in 1972. Their performance was included on the double LP Here's Johnny: Magic Moments From The Tonight Show released by Casablanca Records in 1974.

Tina performed the song along with "A Fool In Love" in an Ike & Tina medley during her early solo live shows in the late 1970s. After hiring Roger Davies in 1980, the song was taken off her setlist.

Personnel

1961 version
Lead vocal by Tina Turner
Spoken vocal by Mickey Baker
Background vocals by Mickey & Sylvia and The Ikettes
Produced by Juggy Murray

1993 version
Lead vocal by Tina Turner
Spoken vocal by Timmy Cappello
Background vocals by Jacquelyn Gouche, Jean McClain and Sharon Brown
Produced by Chris Lord-Alge, Roger Davies and Tina Turner

Cover versions 

 The Kings of Rhythm recorded an instrumental version that was released on the album Ike & Tina Turner's Kings of Rhythm Dance in 1962, which was released as a single in April of that year.
 Manfred Mann covered the song on their album The Five Faces of Manfred Mann in 1964.
 The Spencer Davis Group covered the song on their debut album Their First LP in 1965.
 Ry Cooder recorded an instrumental version of the tune on his Bop Till You Drop album in 1979.
 Linda Ronstadt and James Taylor released a version of "I Think It's Gonna Work Out Fine" on Ronstadt's 1982 album Get Closer.
 Ronnie Spector and Andre Williams released a version of the song on Williams' 2001 album Bait and Switch on Norton Records.

Chart performance

Weekly charts

Year-end charts

References

1961 songs
1961 singles
Ike & Tina Turner songs
Tina Turner songs
Manfred Mann songs
The Spencer Davis Group songs
Songs written by Rose Marie McCoy
Sue Records singles
Linda Ronstadt songs
Ry Cooder songs